The Lagamar Mosaic ( is a protected area mosaic that includes a number of conservation units in the states of São Paulo and Paraná, Brazil.

History

The Lagamar Mosaic was established by federal ordinance 150 of 8 May 2006.
The project was supported by the "Mangroves of Brazil" project as a way of leveraging joint action among the municipal, state and federal mangrove conservation units.
In 2009 about 40% of the area was included as a pilot area of the "Mangroves of Brazil" project.
The mosaic council was formed in October 2013, and included representatives of various government and civil society organisations.

Scope and purpose

The mosaic includes strategic areas for conservation of the remaining mangroves of the south and southeast coasts of Brazil.
Great effort is needed to preserve these areas, and also to preserve the traditional knowledge of the local population that depend on products of the native species.
As of June 2014 there were 52 conservation units in the mosaic, forming the largest continuous remnant of Atlantic forest in Brazil.
A mosaic is defined as a set of protected areas, of the same or different categories, adjacent or nearby, and other public or private protected areas, that are managed in a joint or integrated manner.
The conservation units are made more effective by coordinating their activities.

Conservation units

The Lagamar Mosaic contains the following units:

Notes

Sources

Protected area mosaics of Brazil
Protected areas of São Paulo (state)
Protected areas of Paraná (state)
2006 establishments in Brazil